Phelsuma astriata semicarinata is a subspecies of Seychelles day gecko. It is a small, slender gecko, has a bright green colour and feeds on insects. It is found on different islands of the Seychelles, where it often lives near human dwellings.

Description 
The body of this smallish day gecko is lime green with rost-coloured dots and bars on the back which are irregularly shaped. Those reddish dots form a thin mid-dorsdal stripe, which may be broken and may have some bars extending from it. There is a rust-coloured stripe between the nostril and the eye. On the head there is a  rust-coloured, v-shaped marking with two transverse bars. Males often have a bluish or turquoise coloured tail and lower back. On both sides of the snout, a reddish-brown stripe is extending from the nostrils to the eye. The undersurface of the body is white. These lizards reach a total length of about 12.5 cm.

Distribution 
This gecko is endemic to the Seychelles island Praslin but it has also been introduced to La Réunion, where it had been recorded first in 2004.

Habitat 
This species is typically found on coconut palms and banana trees. It often lives near human settlements.

Diet 
These day geckos feed on insects, small spiders, fruit, nectar and pollen.

Reproduction 
Phelsuma astriata semicarinata normally lays two 10 mm large eggs. The eggs are not glued to leaves, as this species is among the "non-gluer" variety.  Eggs should generally hatch in 70 – 75 days and should be incubated at approximately 25 degrees Celsius.

Care and maintenance in captivity 
Phelsuma astriata semicarinata should be housen in pairs. They need a vertically oriented and well planted terrarium with vertically oriented and horizontally oriented bambus sticks as thick as a thumb.

Bibliography 
Henkel, F.-W. and W. Schmidt (1995) Amphibien und Reptilien Madagaskars, der Maskarenen, Seychellen und Komoren. Ulmer Stuttgart. 
McKeown, Sean (1993) The general care and maintenance of day geckos. Advanced Vivarium Systems, Lakeside CA.

References

Fauna of Seychelles
Phelsuma